The Abydos graffiti is Phoenician and Aramaic graffiti found on the walls of the Temple of Seti I at Abydos, Egypt. The inscriptions are known as KAI 49, CIS I 99-110 and RES 1302ff.

Much of the graffiti represents prayers and votive dedications.

Prior to the discovery of the Abydos graffiti, very few Semitic inscriptions had been found in Egypt – a few Aramaic texts, the Abu Simbel Phoenician graffiti (published by Ampère, Lepsius, and Graham), and an engraved sphinx found in the Serapeum of Saqqara. Abydos was considered to contain the tomb of Osiris, the god of the afterlife, hence it was considered a holy burial place and attracted pilgrimage.

Discovery
The first Phoenician and Aramaic graffiti was recorded by Théodule Devéria during Mariette's excavations at Abydos; 
13 inscriptions were published in 1868 by Hermann Zotenberg. Heinrich Karl Brugsch subsequently made notes of 16 inscriptions. The inscriptions of Deveria and Brugsch were published in the first edition of Corpus Inscriptionum Semiticarum.

In 1885, Joseph Derenbourg and his son Hartwig published an interpretation of 61 inscriptions noted by Archibald Sayce on a visit in 1883.

A small amount of further graffiti was published by Margaret Murray in 1904, together with her excavations at the Osireion (note that no Phoenician or Aramaic graffiti was found on the Osireion which, unlike the other temples, had been hidden underground for many centuries). The Phoenician graffiti was found to be "roughly scratched on the walls, even more roughly than the Greek".

Concordance

Gallery of handwritten notes

CIS, including Deveria and Brugsch

Murray

Sayce

Notes

Bibliography
 Zotenberg, H., "Nouvelles inscriptions phéniciennes d'Égypte." JA sér. 6, t. 11 (1868): 431–50 + 2 pls (also at BNF, including full plate scans)
 Levy, M.A., "Inschriften aus Abydos in Aegypten." Pp. 14–35 + 1 pl. In Phönizische Studien. , Breslau: Schletter, 1870
 Derenbourg, J., & Derenbourg, H. (1885). LES INSCRIPTIONS PHÉNICIENNES DU TEMPLE DE SETI À ABYDOS, PUBLIÉES ET TRADUITES D'APRÈS UNE COPIE INÉDITE DE M. SAYCE. Revue D'Assyriologie Et D'archéologie Orientale, 1(3), 81-101
 Murray, M.A., The Osireion at Abydos. Egyptian Research Account, Ninth Year, 1903 . London: B. Quaritch, 1904
 Kornfeld, W., "Neues über die phonikischen und aramäischen Graffiti in den Tempeln vom Abydos." ÖAW, 115 (1978a): 193–204 + 18 pls.

1868 archaeological discoveries
Phoenician inscriptions
Archaeological artifacts
Graffiti (archaeology)